Gymnostomus is a genus of cyprinid fish found in Southeast Asia.

Species
 Gymnostomus caudiguttatus (Fowler, 1934)
 Gymnostomus cryptopogon (Fowler, 1935)

References

 
Cyprinid fish of Asia
Cyprinidae genera